The 1996 Goodwrench Service 400 was the second stock car race of the 1996 NASCAR Winston Cup Series and the 31st iteration of the event. The race was held on Sunday, February 25, 1996, in Rockingham, North Carolina, at North Carolina Speedway, a  permanent high-banked racetrack. The race took the scheduled 393 laps to complete. In a controversial and wreck-filled race, Richard Childress Racing driver Dale Earnhardt would manage to pass for the lead with 15 to go to take his 69th career NASCAR Winston Cup Series victory and his first victory of the season. To fill out the top three, Robert Yates Racing driver Dale Jarrett and Larry Hedrick Motorsports driver Ricky Craven would finish second and third, respectively.

The race was marred by a crash with TriStar Motorsports driver Loy Allen Jr. on lap 179. Allen's car would blow a right front tire, sending Allen's car into the turn two wall. The car then ricocheted into the inside retaining wall before coming to a stop. Allen was initially unconscious when checked by paramedics, and was placed on a stretcher before regaining consciousness in the ambulance. Allen was eventually diagnosed with a slight head injury and an injured shoulder blade.

Background 

North Carolina Speedway was opened as a flat, one-mile oval on October 31, 1965. In 1969, the track was extensively reconfigured to a high-banked, D-shaped oval just over one mile in length. In 1997, North Carolina Motor Speedway merged with Penske Motorsports, and was renamed North Carolina Speedway. Shortly thereafter, the infield was reconfigured, and competition on the infield road course, mostly by the SCCA, was discontinued. Currently, the track is home to the Fast Track High Performance Driving School.

Entry list 

 (R) denotes rookie driver.

Qualifying 
Qualifying was split into two rounds. The first round was held on Friday, February 23, at 1:00 PM EST. Each driver would have one lap to set a time. During the first round, the top 25 drivers in the round would be guaranteed a starting spot in the race. If a driver was not able to guarantee a spot in the first round, they had the option to scrub their time from the first round and try and run a faster lap time in a second round qualifying run, held on Saturday, February 24, at 11:30 AM EST. As with the first round, each driver would have one lap to set a time. For this specific race, positions 26-38 would be decided on time, and depending on who needed it, a select amount of positions were given to cars who had not otherwise qualified but were high enough in owner's points.

Four drivers would fail to qualify: Elton Sawyer, Randy MacDonald, Gary Bradberry, and Dick Trickle.

Full qualifying results 

*Time not available.

Race results

References 

1996 NASCAR Winston Cup Series
NASCAR races at Rockingham Speedway
February 1996 sports events in the United States
1996 in sports in North Carolina